Channel 54 refers to several television stations:

Canada
The following television stations operate on virtual channel 54 in Canada:
 CFTO-DT-54 in Peterborough, Ontario

See also
 Channel 54 virtual TV stations in the United States

54